Moutabea is a neotropical genus of Polygalaceae with about 10 species. It was first described in 1775 by Jean Aublet.

Description
Moutabea are erect or scandent trees, shrubs, and lianas. Its leaves are alternate, petiolate, and usually glabrous. Its zygomorphic flowers are white or yellow and contain 5 petals which are subequal and 5 sepals which are equal. Its 8 stamens 
are joined into 2 groups of 4. Its ovary is usually 4-locular, though it can be 2- to 5-locular. The berry it produces is edible, globose, and indehiscent. They contain 2 to 5 seeds.

Species
, Plants of the World Online accepted the following species:
Moutabea aculeata (Ruiz & Pav.) Poepp. & Endl.
Moutabea angustifolia Huber
Moutabea arianae Jans.-Jac. & Maas
Moutabea chodatiana Huber
Moutabea excoriata Mart. ex Miq.
Moutabea floribunda J.C.Huber ex J.B.Silveira & Secco
Moutabea gentryi T.Wendt
Moutabea guianensis Aubl.
Moutabea pacifica (Morat & Meijden) Byng & Christenh. – formerly placed in the monotypic genus Balgoya
Moutabea victoriana J.B.Silveira & Secco

References

Polygalaceae
Fabales genera